Tip Off is a basketball game released for the Amiga and Atari. It was developed in 1991 by Anco Software

A Game Boy version was developed by Enigma Variations and published by Imagineer in Europe. An unreleased NES version was also in development.

References 

1991 video games
Amiga games
Atari ST games
Basketball video games
Game Boy games
Imagineer games
Video games scored by David Whittaker
Video games developed in the United Kingdom
Anco Software games